Laire is a commune in the Doubs department in the Bourgogne-Franche-Comté region in eastern France.

Geography

History
The name of the commune was originally spelled Layr and appears for the first time in 1231 in a charter of Thierry (Theodoric) III, Count of Montbéliard

Population

The inhabitants of Laire are called Niauds.

Trivia
 Laire is a live action role playing game ("LAIRE" - Live Action Interactive Role-playing Explorers) located in Sparta, New Jersey, USA. The name is featured in the movie Role Models. France has its own history in medieval history and lore.

See also
 Communes of the Doubs department

References

External links

 Laire on the intercommunal Web site of the department 

Communes of Doubs
County of Montbéliard